Corner is a surname. Notable people with the surname include:
 Chris Corner (born 1974), British musician
 David Gregor Corner (c.1585–1648), German abbot and hymnologist
 Diane Corner (born 1959), British diplomat, deputy head of United Nations MINUSCA
 E. J. H. Corner (1906–1996), British botanist and mycologist
 Frank Corner (1920–2014), New Zealand diplomat
 George Richard Corner (1801–1863), English antiquary
 George W. Corner (1889–1981), American physician and embryologist
 Greg Corner (born 1974), American musician
 Harry Corner (1874–1938), British cricketer
 James Corner (born 1961), American landscape architect
 Philip Corner (born 1933), American musician and composer
 Reggie Corner (born 1983), American football player

Fictional characters:
 Alejandro Corner, character in the anime series Mobile Suit Gundam 00
 Michael Corner, character in the Harry Potter series
 Corner of the Yard, character in the Two Ronnies' The Phantom Raspberry Blower of Old London Town

See also
Cornaro family (Corner in Venetian dialect)